Plover Hill is an area of moorland lying to the north of Pen-y-ghent in the Yorkshire Dales and connected to it by an unbroken area of high ground. Whilst the whole area is now "open access land", the main right-of-way footpaths come directly from the north off Foxup Road and directly from the south from the summit of Pen-y-ghent.

Plover Hill rises between two side valleys of Littondale: the valley of Hesleden Beck to the south and that of Foxup Beck to the north. It lies within the civil parish of Halton Gill.

References

External links

The Complete Guide to the Yorkshire Dales – Hills over 2,000 ft

Hewitts of England
Nuttalls
Peaks of the Yorkshire Dales